HMS Cumberland was a three-decker 80-gun third rate ship of the line of the Royal Navy, launched at Bursledon on 12 November 1695.

Cumberland was captured by the French in the Battle at the Lizard in 1707. She served in the French navy under her old name, and in 1715 was sold to Genoa. The Genoese sold her to Spain in 1717 and she was renamed Principe de Asturias. She was recaptured by the British at the Battle of Cape Passaro in 1718, but did not return to service, and was instead sold to Austria in 1720. She was based at Naples and was renamed San Carlos. She served until being broken up in 1733, having by then served under five flags.

Notes

References

 
Lavery, Brian (2003) The Ship of the Line - Volume 1: The development of the battlefleet 1650-1850. Conway Maritime Press. .
 

Ships of the line of the Royal Navy
1690s ships
Captured ships
Ships built on the River Hamble